The Match des Champions, or French Basketball Supercup (English: Match of Champions) is a yearly held basketball professional super cup game, in France. It is contested by the champions of the top-tier level league in France, the LNB Pro A, and the French Federation Cup winner. The game was introduced in 2005.

Title holders 

 2005 BCM Gravelines-Dunkerque
 2006 JDA Dijon
 2007 Pau-Orthez
 2008 SLUC Nancy
 2009 ASVEL
 2010 Cholet
 2011 SLUC Nancy
 2012 Limoges CSP
 2013 Paris-Levallois
 2014 JSF Nanterre
 2015 SIG
 2016 ASVEL
 2017 Nanterre 92

Finals

Performance by club

References

 
Basketball cup competitions in France
2005 establishments in France
France